Farmers Creek is a stream in Berrien County, in the U.S. state of Michigan. It is a tributary to the St. Joseph River.

Farmers Creek has the name of William Smythe Farmer, an early settler.

References

Rivers of Berrien County, Michigan
Rivers of Michigan